The 1938 Davidson Wildcats football team was an American football team that represented Davidson College during the 1938 college football season as a member of the Southern Conference. In their third year under head coach Gene McEver, the team compiled an overall record of 4–6, with a mark of 2–6 in conference play, and finished in 13th place in the SoCon.

Schedule

References

Davidson
Davidson Wildcats football seasons
Davidson Wildcats football